Smithiantha, sometimes referred to as temple bells, is a genus of flowering plants in the family Gesneriaceae, endemic to southern Mexico, primarily in Oaxaca state.

Species
 Smithiantha amabilis (Decne.) Kuntze
 Smithiantha cinnabarina (Linden) Kuntze
 Smithiantha fulgida (Ortgies ex Van Houtte) Voss
 Smithiantha × hyacinthina (Carrière) H.E. Moore
 Smithiantha multiflora (M. Martens & Galeotti) Fritsch
 Smithiantha punctata (M. Martens & Galeotti) Kuntze
 Smithiantha secunda (Oerst. ex Hanst.) Kuntze
 Smithiantha zebrina (Regel) Kuntze
 Smithiantha zebrina var. geroltiana (Kunth & C.D. Bouché) Voss

References

 The Plant List
 Pacific Bulb Society

Gesnerioideae
Gesneriaceae genera